Lisa Carlsen is an American women's basketball coach and former basketball player. She is currently the women's basketball head coach at Northern Illinois University. She previously served as the women's  basketball head coach at Lewis University and the University of Nebraska Omaha.

Early life and education
Carlson is from Earling, Iowa.  She attended Northwest Missouri State University where she played college basketball and was a named all-conference four times. She was named 1992 Champion NCAA Female Athlete of the Year after her senior year. She also played college softball where she earned all-conference and all-region accolades. She earned a bachelor's degree in 1992 and a master's degree in 1994 from Northwest Missouri State. She played basketball professionally in the Women's American Basketball Association for three seasons with the Nebraska Express.

Coaching career
Prior to coaching basketball, she was a softball coach at St. Mary (Neb.) from 1994 to 1997 where she was the Midlands Collegiate Athletic Conference Coach of the Year twice. At Wayne State College (Neb.) she was the softball head coach and an assistant volleyball coach from 1997 to 1998. Her overall record as a softball coach was 120–51.

Her first job as a basketball coach was in 1998 as an assistant at Omaha then in NCAA Division II. She was promoted to head coach in 2000 where she remained for four seasons with a record of 36–75.

Lewis
She was the associate head coach at Winona State for three years before taking the women's basketball head coaching position at Lewis in 2007. In eight seasons at Lewis she posted an overall record of 148–89 with appearances in the NCAA Division II women's basketball tournament and two Great Lakes Valley Conference championships. Her 2015 team went 31–3 and made the Division II Elite Eight. They began the season 23–0. She was named GLVC Coach of the Year and Division II National Coach of the Year. During her tenure with the Flyers the program had a 100 percent graduation rate.

Northern Illinois
On June 30, 2015 she was named the head coach at Northern Illinois. Through the 2021–22 season her record at the school was 103–105. She led her team to the 2017 Women's National Invitation Tournament.

Head coaching record

Personal life
She and her husband, Chris, have four children.

References

External links
Northern Illinois Huskies coaching bio

Living people
Northern Illinois Huskies women's basketball coaches
Lewis Flyers women's basketball coaches
Omaha Mavericks women's basketball coaches
Northwest Missouri State University alumni
American women's basketball coaches
Year of birth missing (living people)
Northwest Missouri State Bearcats athletes